Metaverse is the sum of all virtual spaces.

Metaverse may also refer to:

 Multiverse, the set of all universes
 Fictional universe, with multiple alternate timelines
 Prime Earth in the DC Universe
 The Metaverse, a supernatural dimension derived from the collective unconscious in Persona 5
 DA Metaverse, a music project of Daisuke Asakura
 Zompist.com, aka "The Metaverse", a constructed languages website
 Facebook Metaverse, an online reality virtual space project at Meta Platforms (Meta Inc., formerly, Facebook Inc.) 
 Decentraland, a 3D virtual world browser-based platform

See also

 
 
 Megaverse (disambiguation)
 Multiverse (disambiguation)
 Omniverse (disambiguation)
 Universe (disambiguation)
 Meta (disambiguation)
 Verse (disambiguation)